Lewes Football Club Women is a women's football club affiliated with Lewes F.C. The club compete in the  and play at The Dripping Pan. The team's highest ever league finish was 5th place in the second-tier FA Women's Championship in 2020–21.

History

Lewes Ladies FC was established in 2002 as the women's affiliate of Lewes FC, a not-for-profit club helping pioneer 100% fan and community ownership. The team started playing in the South East Counties football league and within a ten-year period climbed through the pyramid, winning promotion to the fourth-tier FA Women's Premier League in 2012 following an unbeaten season.

In 2017, Lewes became the first professional or semi-professional football club to pay its women's team the same as its men's team as part of their Equality FC initiative.

In 2018, the team was awarded a place in the FA Women's Championship. In September 2019 club director Barry Collins resigned, frustrated at the board's preoccupation with equality campaigning: "I joined a football club and feel like I'm leaving a political party".

Managerial history

Current squad

Season summary
Key
 QF = Quarter-finals
 SF = Semi-finals

See also
:Category:Lewes F.C. Women players
Football in Sussex

References

External links
 Official website

Women's football clubs in England
Lewes F.C.
Football clubs in East Sussex
Association football clubs established in 2002
2002 establishments in England
FA Women's National League teams